Peize is a village in the Dutch province of Drenthe. Located in the northern part of Drenthe approximately 10 kilometers south of the city of Groningen.  It is part of the municipality of Noordenveld, located between Roden and Eelde.

Peize was a separate municipality between 1817 and 1998, when it became part of Noordenveld.

At the present day it is a commuter village for the cities of Groningen and Assen.

Education

Two public schools are located in Peize. They are named "De Eskampen" and "Het Spectrum", in 2009 they have moved to new buildings in close proximity to the sports accommodation. In the past a third school was located at 'De Pol'.

Adult and secondary education can be found in nearby villages or in the city of Groningen.

Sport

Close to the center there is a sports accommodation. This houses a sports hall and several soccer fields and clay tennis courts. Several sports clubs can be found. These include soccer, volleyball, judo, marionettes, tennis.

Transport

Bus 
Qbuzz runs several buses.
86: Norg - Peize - Hoogkerk - Groningen (Main Station) (Only during peak hours)
4: Groningen (Beijum) - P+R Kardinge - Peize - Roden
17: Groningen (P+R Zernike) - Peize - (only in the morning)

Road 
N372: Connects Peize in the north to Groningen and to the west to Roden and Leek. At both ends it connects with the A7 Motorway
N386: Goes Southbound towards Vries to connect with the A28 Motorway.

Air 

The small international Groningen Airport Eelde is located 5 kilometers East of Peize. Mainly charter flights to holiday destinations are carried out here.

Culture
 A late nineteenth century windmill can be found, which is open for public.
 A common hop (Humulus lupulus) garden.
 A thirteenth century church for public.

Notable people 
 Stefan Poutsma (born 1991), racing cyclist
 Joost Winnink (born 1971), former tennis player

References

Municipalities of the Netherlands disestablished in 1998
Populated places in Drenthe
Former municipalities of Drenthe
Noordenveld